The northern blind snake (Epictia teaguei) is a species of snake in the family Leptotyphlopidae. The species is endemic to Peru.

Etymology
The specific name, teaguei, is in honor of Gerard Warden Teague (1885–1974), a herpetologist and ichthyologist who was born in England and worked in South America.

Geographic range
E. teaguei is found in northern Peru.

Reproduction
E. teaguei is oviparous.

References

Further reading
Adalsteinsson SA, Branch WR, Trape S, Vitt LJ, Hedges SB (2009). "Molecular phylogeny, classification, and biogeography of snakes of the family Leptotyphlopidae (Reptilia, Squamata)". Zootaxa 2244: 1-50. (Epictia teaguei, new combination).
Orejas-Miranda BR (1964). "Dos nuevos Leptotyphlopidae de Sur America ". Comunicaciones Zoológicas del Museo de Historia Natural de Montevideo 8 (103): 1–7. (Leptotyphlops teaguei, new species). (in Spanish).

Epictia
Reptiles described in 1964